Wayne Cegielski (born 11 January 1956) is a former Welsh under-21 international footballer. A defender, he played 282 league games in a thirteen-year career in the Football League.

An FA Youth Cup winner with Tottenham Hotspur in 1974, he played on loan at Northampton Town, before joining German side Stuttgarter Kickers in 1975. He played in the United States for the Tacoma Tides, before heading to Welsh club Wrexham in 1976. He helped the club to the Third Division title in 1977–78, before they reached the Welsh Cup final in 1979. He signed with Port Vale in July 1982, and won promotion out of the Fourth Division in 1982–83, also being named as the club's Player of the Year. He joined Blackpool in 1985, as the club won promotion out of the Fourth Division. He then spent a two-year spell with Hereford United, before joining non-league Worcester City in 1987. His final club was Northwich Victoria.

Career
Cegielski started his career at Tottenham Hotspur in May 1973, and was a member of the FA Youth Cup winning side of 1974. However he didn't play a First Division game for Terry Neill's side, and was instead loaned out to Fourth Division side Northampton Town. He played eleven league games for Bill Dodgin's "Cobblers".

He left White Hart Lane in 1975, and linked up with German side VfB Stuttgart. He played five games in 2. Bundesliga for István Sztáni's "Reds" in 1975–76, before he departed for the United States to play for Tacoma Tides in the ASL.

He returned to the UK in September 1976, and signed with Third Division Wrexham, then managed by John Neal. The "Red Dragons" finished fifth in 1976–77, one point behind promoted Crystal Palace. Arfon Griffiths took the reins for the 1977–78 campaign, and Wrexham topped the division with 61 points. Wrexham retained their Second Division status in 1978–79, and qualified for the European Cup Winners' Cup after reaching the final of the Welsh Cup, where they lost out to Shrewsbury Town. A mid-table finish followed in 1979–80, before they avoided relegation in 1980–81 by just two points. Mel Sutton took charge for the 1981–82 campaign, however this time the club finished two points away from safety, and were relegated back into the third tier.

Cegielski left Wrexham with 123 league appearances to his name, and joined John McGrath's Fourth Division Port Vale in July 1982. He quickly slotted into the squad and was a regular in the 1982–83 promotion winning season, picking up the Player of the Year award at the end of the campaign. During the season he hit five goals in 48 games, striking in wins against Hereford United, Halifax Town, Crewe Alexandra, Aldershot, and Peterborough United. He then played 43 games in 1983–84, as the club suffered relegation. He fell out of favour under John Rudge in 1984–85, as Phil Sproson and Alan Webb built up a partnership.

Cegielski was allowed to move to Blackpool on a free transfer in March 1985. In six games for Sam Ellis' club, he scored one goal – Blackpool's first in a 6–1 victory over Crewe Alexandra at Bloomfield Road on 9 April 1985. The "Tangerines" won promotion out of the Fourth Division as runners-up, but he was not retained beyond the end of the season.

He then linked up with manager Johnny Newman at Hereford United, and made a total of 66 appearances for the club in league and cup. The "Bulls" finished in mid-table in the fourth tier in 1985–86 and 1986–87, after which Cegielski left the Football League for non-league Worcester City. He later turned out for Northwich Victoria.

Career statistics
Source:

Honours
Individual
 Port Vale F.C. Player of the Year: 1982–83

Tottenham Hotspur
 FA Youth Cup: 1974

Wrexham
 Football League Third Division: 1977–78
 Welsh Cup runner-up: 1979

Port Vale
 Football League Fourth Division third-place promotion: 1982–83

Blackpool
Football League Fourth Division second-place promotion: 1984–85

References

1956 births
Living people
People from Bedwellty
Sportspeople from Caerphilly County Borough
People from Blackwood, Caerphilly
Welsh footballers
Welsh expatriate footballers
Wales under-21 international footballers
Welsh people of Polish descent
Association football central defenders
Expatriate footballers in West Germany
Expatriate soccer players in the United States
Welsh expatriate sportspeople in West Germany
Welsh expatriate sportspeople in the United States
Tottenham Hotspur F.C. players
Northampton Town F.C. players
Stuttgarter Kickers players
Tacoma Tides players
Wrexham A.F.C. players
Port Vale F.C. players
Blackpool F.C. players
Hereford United F.C. players
Worcester City F.C. players
Northwich Victoria F.C. players
English Football League players
Southern Football League players
National League (English football) players
2. Bundesliga players
Welsh expatriate sportspeople in Sweden
Expatriate footballers in Sweden